The 2014 Indianapolis motorcycle Grand Prix was the tenth round of the 2014 MotoGP season. It was held at the Indianapolis Motor Speedway in Indianapolis on 10 August 2014.

Classification

MotoGP

Moto2
The first attempt to run the race was interrupted following an incident involving Randy Krummenacher, Mattia Pasini, Azlan Shah and Anthony West. For the restart, the race distance was reduced from 25 to 16 laps.

Moto3

Championship standings after the race (MotoGP)
Below are the standings for the top five riders and constructors after round ten has concluded.

Riders' Championship standings

Constructors' Championship standings

 Note: Only the top five positions are included for both sets of standings.

References

Indianapolis
Indianapolis Motorcycle Grand Prix
Indianapolis motorcycle Grand Prix
Indy
Indianapolis motorcycle Grand Prix